Leon Gordon Bennett (January 12, 1894 – January 4, 1960) was an English-born playwright, screenwriter, actor, and director who wrote the screenplay for White Cargo.

Biography

Gordon was born in Brighton, England in January 1894 and studied at St. John's College. He became an actor and was a leading man with the Boston Repertory Company. He began writing plays. After directing plays in Australia he joined MGM in 1930.

He died of a heart ailment at the Cedars of Lebanon Hospital, in Los Angeles, California on January 4, 1960. He was survived by two daughters.

Select film credits
Sandra (1924) (as an actor)
Heartbreak (1931)
Freaks (1932)
Age of Indiscretion (1935)
The Last of Mrs. Cheyney (1937)
A Yank at Oxford (1938)
Broadway Melody of 1940 (1940)
They Met in Bombay (1941)
White Cargo (1942)
Kim (1950)
The Hour of 13 (1952)

Select plays
Watch Your Neighbour (1923)
Garden of Weeds (1925)
The Piker (1926)

References

External links

1894 births
1960 deaths
English male dramatists and playwrights
20th-century English dramatists and playwrights
20th-century English male writers
British emigrants to the United States